The Vysun, Vulsun or Isun is a river of Ukraine, flowing through the Mykolaiv Oblast. It is a right tributary of the Inhulets. It has a length of 201 km and begins in the Dnieper Upland and flows south through Prychornomorskoy Lowland, through the district center of Kazanka. It covers a basin of 2670 km2. During season it is powered mainly by snowmelt.

References

Rivers of Mykolaiv Oblast